Rodney Arthur Fitch, CBE (19 August 1938 – 20 October 2014) was an English designer. He founded the design company Fitch in 1972, and rejoined it as chairman and CEO in 2004. He was appointed Commander of The Most Excellent Order of the British Empire (CBE) in 1990 for his 'influence on the British Design Industry'.

Fitch died of cancer on 20 October 2014, at the age of 76.

Background
Fitch had a successful career in design which allowed him to be active in the development of design education and the arts in the United Kingdom. At the time of his death he held the title of Senior Governor of the University of the Arts, located in London. Fitch was awarded a Commander of the Order of the British Empire in 1990 for his influence on the British design industry.

Experience
Fitch had the following experience:
trustee of the Victoria & Albert Museum
Chairman of V & A Enterprises 
member of the Design Council
A member of the Council of the Royal College of Art
President of the Designers and Art Directors Association
President of Chartered Society of Designers

References

1938 births
Deaths from cancer in England
Commanders of the Order of the British Empire
English interior designers
English industrial designers
Product design
2014 deaths
Place of birth missing
Academic staff of Willem de Kooning Academy
20th-century English businesspeople